João Domingos Bomtempo (also Buontempo; Lisbon, 28 December 1775 – Lisbon, 18 August 1842) was a Portuguese classical pianist, composer and pedagogue.

Biography
Bomtempo was the son of an Italian musician in the Portuguese court orchestra, and studied at the Music Seminary of the Patriarchal See in Lisbon. Unlike most of his contemporaries, he was not interested in opera and, in 1801, instead of going to Italy, he traveled to Paris, where he started a career as a virtuoso pianist. He moved to London in 1810 and became acquainted with liberal circles in that city. 

During 1822 he returned to Lisbon, and founded there a Philharmonic Society to promote public concerts of contemporary music. After the Portuguese civil war between liberals and absolutists had resulted in a liberal victory, Bomtempo became a music teacher to the young Queen Maria II of Portugal and first Director of the National Conservatory, created in 1835 to replace the old Patriarchal Seminary, which had been abolished by the new liberal regime.

Bomtempo composed a vast number of concertos (many of them newly published by Soundpost.org), sonatas, variations and fantasies for the piano. His two known symphonies are the first to be produced by a Portuguese composer. But his largest work, and probably his masterpiece, is his Requiem in memory of Luís de Camões, which has been released on CD.

List of compositions

Op. 1 - Piano Sonata No. 1 in F major
Op. 2 - Piano Concerto No.1 in E flat major (ca. 1804)
Op. 3 - Piano Concerto No.2 in F minor (ca. 1800-1810)
Op. 4 - Fandango & Variations for piano
Op. 5 - Piano Sonata No. 2 in C minor
Op. 6 - Introduction, 5 variations & fantasy on Paisiello's favorite air for piano
Op. 7 - Piano Concerto No.3 in G minor
Op. 8 - Capriccio & Variations on God save the King for piano in E flat major
Op. 9 No.1 - Piano Sonata No. 3 in E flat major
Op. 9 No.2 - Piano Sonata No. 4 in C major
Op. 9 No.3 - Sonata for violin and harpsichord in E major
Op. 10a - Hymno lusitano (cantata); Arrangement by the composer for piano 4-hands titled: March of Lord Wellington
Op. 10b - La Virtù Trionfante (cantata)
Op. 11 - Symphony No.1 in E flat major
Op. 12 - Piano Concerto No.4 in D major (1811-1812)
Op. 13 - Piano Sonata No. 5 in C major
Op. 14 - Fantasia for piano in C minor
Op. 15 No.1 - Piano Sonata No. 6 in A flat major
Op. 15 No.2 - Piano Sonata No. 7 in G minor
Op. 15 No.3 - Variations for piano on a popular French song
Op. 16 - Piano Quintet in E flat major
Op. 17 - A paz da Europa (cantata)
Op. 18 No.1 - Piano Sonata No. 8 in G major
Op. 18 No.2 - Piano Sonata No. 9 in F minor
Op. 18 No.3 - Piano Sonata No.10 in E flat major
Op. 19 - 12 Studies for piano (1816)
Op. 20 - Piano Sonata No.11 in E flat major
Op. 21 - Variations for piano on a theme from Die Zauberflöte in G minor
Op. 22 - Variations for piano on a theme from Alessandro in Efeso in B flat major
Op. 23 - Requiem in C minor (1819-1820)
Op. 24 - Piano Concerto No.5 in C minor/major

 4 Absolutions, B5
 Libera me Domine in C minor
 Piano Concerto No.6 in E minor, B26 (1810-1840)
 Piano Quintet in D minor, B74
 Serenata for piano and winds in F major, B75 (1821-1830)
 Symphony No.2 in D major, B16
 Te Deum in F major, B10
 Variations for piano on a theme from La donna del Lago in E minor (1822)
 Fantasy for piano and orchestra (on a theme from La donna del Lago)
 Waltz for piano
Alessandro in Efeso, opera seria
 Tantum Ergo, Kyrie, Gloria e Credo (1842)

References

External links

Tantum Ergo, Kyrie, Gloria e Credo - on-going cooperative transcription in the Wiki-score platform of the score of Bomtempo's last work.
Bio, Audio Files, List of Works, Links, Bibliography, Discography

1775 births
1842 deaths
18th-century classical composers
18th-century classical pianists
18th-century keyboardists
18th-century male musicians
18th-century musicians
19th-century classical composers
19th-century classical pianists
19th-century keyboardists
19th-century male musicians
19th-century musicians
Portuguese Classical-period composers
Male classical pianists
People from Lisbon
Composers for piano
Portuguese classical composers
Portuguese classical pianists
Portuguese male classical composers
Portuguese people of Italian descent
Portuguese Romantic composers